Peins is a village in Waadhoeke in the province of Friesland, the Netherlands. It had a population of around 260 in January 2014. Up to 2018, the village was part of the Franekeradeel municipality.

History 
The village was first mentioned in the 13th century Pesinghe, and means "settlement of the people of Pese (person)". Peins is a terp (artificial living hill) living which probably dates from the beginning of our era. The clay wall to Franeker which later turned into a road. The Dutch Reformed church dates from around 1300 and was extensively modified in 1865. The tower was replaced in 1912.

Peins was home to 168 people in 1840.

Gallery

References

Waadhoeke
Populated places in Friesland